Frasin may refer to:

Romania
 Frasin, a town in Suceava County
 Frasin, a village in Pleșoi Commune, Dolj County
 Frasin, a village in Vladimir Commune, Gorj County
 Frasin, a village administered by Broșteni town, Suceava County
 Frasin-Deal and Frasin-Vale, villages in Cobia Commune, Dâmbovița County
 Frasin, a tributary of the Bistricioara in Neamț County
 Frasin, a tributary of the Bistra in Neamț County
 Frasin (Jijia), a tributary of the Jijia in Iași County
 Frasin, a tributary of the Șușița in Gorj County
 Frasin, a tributary of the Tazlăul Sărat in Bacău County

Moldova
 Frasin, Dondușeni, a commune in Donduşeni district
 Frasin, a village in Ivanovca Commune, Hîncești district

See also 
 Frasinu (disambiguation)
 Frăsinet (disambiguation)
 Frăsiniș